Pterocyclophora huntei is a moth of the family Noctuidae first described by Warren in 1903. It is found in Seram, New Guinea, Australia and the Solomon Islands.

References

External links
"Pterocyclophora huntei". CSIRO. With images.

Catocalinae
Moths described in 1903